

Captive Audience: The Telecom Industry and Monopoly Power in the New Gilded Age is an American non-fiction book by the legal expert Susan P. Crawford. It describes high-speed internet access in the United States as essential (like electricity) but currently too slow and too expensive. To enable widespread quality of life and to ensure national competitiveness "most Americans should have access to reasonably priced 1-Gb symmetric fiber-to-the-home networks." Crawford explains why the United States should revise national policy to increase competition in a market currently dominated by Comcast, Verizon Communications, AT&T, and Time Warner Cable.  Meanwhile, towns and cities should consider setting up local networks after the example of pioneers such as Lafayette, Louisiana's LUSFiber and Chattanooga, Tennessee's EPB.

See also
 Institute for Local Self-Reliance
 Comcast NBC merger
 Criticism of Comcast
 Federal Communications Commission
 National Broadband Plan (United States)
 Municipal broadband
 Cities with Municipal Wireless Networks

References

Further reading

External links
 Official website
 
After Words interview with Crawford on Captive Audience, August 3, 2013

2013 non-fiction books
American non-fiction books
AT&T
Comcast
Time Warner Cable
Verizon Communications
Internet service providers of the United States
2010s in the United States
Books about politics of the United States
Books about the Internet
Internet access
Broadband
Yale University Press books